HD 104067 is a star with a planetary companion in the southern constellation of Corvus. It has an apparent visual magnitude of 7.92 which is too faint to be visible with the naked eye. The distance to this star is 66 light years based on parallax. It is drifting further away with a radial velocity of +15 km/s.

This is an ordinary K-type main-sequence star with a stellar classification of K3V. It is a moderately active star with an age of roughly five billion years. HD 104067 is spinning with a projected rotational velocity of 2.5 km/s, giving it a rotation period of approximately a month. The star has 82% of the mass and 77% of the radius of the Sun. It is radiating 31% of the Sun's luminosity from its photosphere at an effective temperature of 4,942 K. The metal content of this star is close to that in the Sun.

Planetary system
HD 104067 has been observed as part of the HARPS planet finding survey since 2004. The detection of an exoplanetary companion using the radial velocity method was announced in 2011.

See also 
 List of extrasolar planets

References 

K-type main-sequence stars
Planetary systems with one confirmed planet

Corvus (constellation)
Durchmusterung objects
1153
104067
058451